Broken is the sixth studio album by American metalcore band Memphis May Fire. It was released on November 16, 2018, on Rise Records. The album serves as a follow-up to the band's fifth studio album, This Light I Hold (2016). It is the group's first studio album since 2011's The Hollow to not feature guitarist Anthony Sepe since his departure in 2017. The album as produced by Kane Churko, the band's guitarist Kellen McGregor, and Drew Fulk and was recorded at The Hideout Studios.

The album was supported by the lead single "The Old Me", which was released on September 19, 2018. In support of the album, the group embarked on Atreyu's headlining U.S. tour in November and December 2018.

The album was the band's first album since the 2009 debut album Sleepwalking to not chart on the Billboard 200. However, "The Old Me" charted and peaked at number 19 on the Billboard Mainstream Rock Songs chart in March 2019.

Track listing

Personnel
Memphis May Fire
 Matty Mullins - vocals
 Kellen McGregor - guitars, keyboards
 Cory Elder - bass
 Jake Garland - drums

Production
 Kellen McGregor - producer, composer
 Matty Mullins - composer
 Drew Fulk - mixing, mastering
 Kane Churko - producer, composer
 Tristan Hardin - engineer
 Andy Mineo - featured vocals (on "Heavy Is the Weight")
 Alan Ashcraft - creative director
 Kevin Moore - design, layout

References

2018 albums
Memphis May Fire albums
Rise Records albums